The black-headed tody-flycatcher (Todirostrum nigriceps) is a species of bird in the family Tyrannidae.
It is found in Colombia, Costa Rica, Ecuador, Panama, and Venezuela.
Its natural habitat is subtropical or tropical moist lowland forests.

References

Todirostrum
Birds described in 1855
Taxonomy articles created by Polbot